Elisabeth Scherer (30 July 1914 – 18 April 2013) was a German actress. She appeared in more than 30 films and television shows between 1942 and 2009.

Selected filmography
 Doctor Crippen (1942)
 A Double Life (1954)
  (2000)
 Mädchen, Mädchen (2001)

References

External links

1914 births
2013 deaths
German film actresses
Actors from Cologne